Dorothy Shaver (July 29, 1893 – June 29, 1959) was the first woman in the United States to head a multimillion-dollar firm. She was a well known leader of the fashion industry.

Life
Dorothy Shaver was born in Center Point, Arkansas, in Howard County, Arkansas, to Sallie Borden and James Shaver. Her paternal grandfather was Confederate officer Robert G. Shaver. When she was five years old, the family moved to Mena, Arkansas and James Shaver opened a law practice.  The Shaver House has been listed on the National Register of Historic Places since 1979.

Shaver graduated from high school in 1910 at the age of 17 and she was chosen by her classmates to give the commencement address. She then earned a teaching certificate from the University of Arkansas. Shaver returned to Mena and began teaching seventh grade. Her teaching career ended abruptly in May 1914, when the local board refused to renew the contracts of Shaver and three other single female teachers because they had attended an unchaperoned dance.

In 1916, Shaver and her younger sister Elsie moved to Chicago. While in Chicago, Dorothy studied English literature at the University of Chicago. A year later, the sisters moved to New York City. Elsie began making dolls out of bandage cotton painted in pastel colors. Inspired by the success of the Kewpie Doll, Dorothy began selling five different versions of Elsie's Little Shaver dolls. A Lord & Taylor executive and distant cousin named Samuel Reyburn was impressed by the dolls and helped the sisters set up a workshop producing dolls for the next four years.

Samuel Reyburn hired Dorothy to head comparison shopping bureau at Lord & Taylor in 1921. A year later, she established an interior decorating service at Lord & Taylor.  Shaver was elected to the store's board of directors in 1927.

In 1928, Shaver mounted the Exposition of Modern French Decorative Art at Lord & Taylor as a spin-off of the Exposition Internationale des Arts Decoratifs et Industriels Modernes. In addition to furniture and home goods, Shaver's Exposition included paintings by artists such as Picasso, Utrillo, and Derain.

Having made a splash in the media with her French design, Shaver switched her focus to American designers.  In 1929, she hired Neysa McNein and other American artists to create fabrics with American themes for Lord & Taylor.

Shaver became one of the founding member of the Fashion Group in February 1931. The Fashion Group was a networking organization for women in the fashion industry. Other founding members included Elizabeth Arden and Helena Rubinstein.

In 1932, Shaver created the American Look program to promote American fashion designers. Between 1932 and 1939, the American Look program featured more than sixty designers, including Clare Potter, Merry Hull, Nettie Rosenstein, and Lilly Dache. The clothing lines was moderately priced, well-constructed, sportswear.

Shaver succeeded Walter Hoving as president of Lord & Taylor in 1945. She was given a salary of $110,000.  This was the highest salary on record for an American woman at that time, and although it was noted by the author of an article in Life Magazine that the salary was only a quarter of what some "similarly placed male CEOs earned" [comparing it with Thomas J. Watson Sr., President of International Business Machines], the salary was commensurate with what Lord & Taylor paid its top male executives. Walter Hoving, her predecessor, was earning a salary after 10 years as chief executive of $127,015 in 1944.

In 1947, Life Magazine called Shaver "the No. 1 American career woman."  By that point, she was managing a $40 million business.

Shaver served as president of Lord & Taylor until her death in 1959. By the time of her death, sales at Lord & Taylor reached $100 million a year.

Designers promoted 
Promoted by Shaver and sold at Lord & Taylor
 Lilly Dache
 Elizabeth Hawes
 Merry Hull
 Muriel King
Claire McCardell
 Vera Maxwell
 Norman Norell
 Clare Potter
 Nettie Rosenstein
 Pauline Trigere

References

External links
 Little Shaver Dolls (1919)

1893 births
1959 deaths
People from Howard County, Arkansas
Businesspeople from Arkansas
20th-century American businesspeople
Women corporate directors
20th-century American businesswomen
People from Polk County, Arkansas
University of Chicago alumni